Andrew Salgado (born 1982) is a Canadian artist who works in London and has exhibited his work around the world.  His paintings are large-scale works of portraiture that incorporate elements of abstraction and symbolic meaning.

Biography 
Andrew Salgado received BFA from University of BC in Vancouver in 2005 and graduated with MFA from Chelsea College of Art & Design in London at 2009.

Salgado was featured in the 2014 documentary Storytelling, which followed him as he created a series of works.  In 2013, he was awarded the Emerging Artist Award as part of the Lieutenant Governor's Arts Awards in Saskatchewan.

Andrew Salgado lives and works in London.

Personal life 
Andrew Salgado is openly gay. In 2008 he was a victim of homophobic violence, when his partner and him were beaten by eight guys during a music festival in British Columbia.

Exhibitions 
 2013 Andrew Salgado: The Acquaintance, Art Gallery of Regina.
 2016 The Snake, Beers Gallery, London.

References

External links 

Living people
1982 births
Canadian painters
Artists from London
Place of birth missing (living people)
Canadian LGBT artists
21st-century Canadian LGBT people